A number of  steamships were named Principessa Jolanda, including -

, an Italian cargo ship wrecked in 1926
, an Italian ocean liner wrecked on launch

Ship names